Mathias Stein (born 21 February 1970) is a German politician of the Social Democratic Party (SPD) who has been serving as a member of the Bundestag from the state of Schleswig-Holstein since 2017.

Political career 
Stein first became a member of the Bundestag in the 2017 German federal election. In parliament, he is a member of the Committee on Transport and Digital Infrastructure. He is his parliamentary group’s rapporteur on cycling.

Within his parliamentary group, Stein belongs to the Parliamentary Left, a left-wing movement.

Other activities 
 German Cyclist’s Association (ADFC), Member
 German United Services Trade Union (ver.di), Member

References

External links 

  
 Bundestag biography 

1970 births
Living people
Members of the Bundestag for Schleswig-Holstein
Members of the Bundestag 2021–2025
Members of the Bundestag 2017–2021
Members of the Bundestag for the Social Democratic Party of Germany